Guadalupe Francisco Javier Castellón Fonseca (born 21 September 1960) is a Mexican politician affiliated with the Party of the Democratic Revolution. As of 2014 he served as Senator of the LX and LXI Legislatures of the Mexican Congress representing Nayarit.

References

1960 births
Living people
Politicians from Nayarit
People from Santiago Ixcuintla
Members of the Senate of the Republic (Mexico)
Party of the Democratic Revolution politicians
21st-century Mexican politicians
Autonomous University of Baja California alumni
National Autonomous University of Mexico alumni
Autonomous University of Nayarit alumni